Old City Hall, also known as the Market House, is a historic city hall located at St. Charles, St. Charles County, Missouri. It was built in 1832 as the Market House, and underwent alterations in 1886.  It is a two-story, vernacular brick building on a rockfaced ashlar foundation. It features segmental arched openings, pilasters, and a mansard roof.

It was added to the National Register of Historic Places in 1980.

References

Government buildings on the National Register of Historic Places in Missouri
Government buildings completed in 1832
City halls in Missouri
Former seats of local government
Buildings and structures in St. Charles County, Missouri
National Register of Historic Places in St. Charles County, Missouri
1832 establishments in Missouri